Wusono Budi Ugiek Sugiyanto (born 18 June 1981) is an Indonesian professional footballer who plays as a striker for Liga 3 club Persiba Bantul.

Honours

Club
Persiba Bantul
 Indonesian Premier Division: 2010-11
PSCS Cilacap
 Indonesia Soccer Championship B: 2016
Kalteng Putra
 Liga 2 third place (play-offs): 2018

Individual
 ISC B Best Player: 2016

References

External links
 Ugik Sugiyanto at Soccerway
 Ugik Sugiyanto at Liga Indonesia

1981 births
Living people
Sportspeople from Malang
Indonesian footballers
PSIM Yogyakarta players
Persis Solo players
Indonesian Premier Division players
Indonesian Premier League players
Association football forwards